National Choreographers Initiative (NCI) is a non-profit dance organization based in Irvine, California, that promotes the development of choreographers from all over the United States in the professional ballet world. NCI hosts a three-week workshop with selected professional dancers, who have auditioned from various ballet companies throughout the United States. The choreographers each produce a work in progress, which are then showcased at the Irvine Barclay Theatre. These performances are open to the public and are held every year in late July. National Choreographers Initiative was founded in 2004 by Molly Lynch. The rehearsals and dancer accommodations are hosted by the Claire Trevor School of the Arts at the University of California, Irvine campus.

Past dancers have been from companies such as: Boston Ballet, Nevada Ballet Theatre, BalletMet, Ballet Austin, Kansas City Ballet, and Hubbard Street Dance Chicago.

10th anniversary celebrations
In honor of NCI's 10th successful season, there were two performances at the Barclay Theatre in Irvine, California. NCI highlights will feature excerpts from works from the past decade on July 13, 2013, and NCI Discovery will showcase the work done by Fernandez, McCullough, McNamee, and Zahradnicek on July 27, 2013.

10th anniversary facts
 
 Each year four choreographers are invited to participate in the project. Annual choreographer submissions have 20 to 55. NCI has worked with 37 different choreographers, including 14 women.
16 professional dancers are hired from companies throughout the United States, including BalletMet, Nashville Ballet, Sacramento Ballet, Louisville Ballet, Atlanta Ballet, Richmond Ballet, and Smuin Ballet. There have been 30 companies represented by 88 dancers who have participated.  The 16 are selected from a pool of 78 dancers who auditioned and/or applied.
 22 ballets developed at NCI have gone on to be premiered or performed by other companies: including Grand Rapids Ballet, Richmond Ballet, Smuin Ballet, Nashville Ballet, Morphoses Ballet, Hong Kong Ballet, Carolina Ballet, River North Dance Chicago, and Barak Ballet.
 Two choreographers are now artistic directors of companies: Edwaard Liang – BalletMet and Melissa Barak – Barak Ballet
 Three choreographers have participated in the project twice: Ann Marie DeAngelo, Peter Pucci, and Melissa Barak
 Four University of California, Irvine dancers have participated as apprentices in the project
 Choreographers have used their work at NCI to gain other choreographic projects
 Dancers have changed company employment based on contacts made at NCI

Dancers
The 2018 NCI Dancer Cast:
Women:
Jocelyn “Josie” Green – Dayton Ballet
Ashley Hathaway – Carolina Ballet
Tessia “Tess” Lane – California Ballet
Elise Pekarek – Ballet Austin
Lauren Pschirrer – Smuin Ballet
Maggie Rupp – Sacramento Ballet
Sarah Joan Smith – Kansas City Ballet
Jordan Nicole Tilton – Diablo Ballet

Men:
Anthony Cannarella – Sacramento Ballet
Oliver Greene-Cramer – Ballet Austin
Jonathan Harris – Sacramento Ballet
David Hochberg – Nevada Ballet Theatre
Isaac Jones – Dayton Ballet
Morgan Stillman – Ballet Austin
Maté Szentes – Richmond Ballet 
Benjamin Tucker – Nevada Ballet Theatre

Choreographers
Artistic Director Molly Lynch accepts choreographer applications throughout the year, and then selects four choreographers to be participate in the annual National Choreographers Initiative.

2018

Kevin Jenkins
David Justin
Ilya Kozadayev
Mariana Oliviera

2017

Suzanne Haag
Robert Mills
Penny Saunders
Christopher Stuart

2016

Tom Gold 
Nicole Haskins 
Stephanie Martinez
Ben Needham-Wood

2015

Nicolas Blanc
Norberto De La Cruz
Jimmy Orrante
Sarah Tallman

2014

Barry Kerollis
Gabrielle Lamb
Philip Neal
Garrett Smith

2013

 David Fernandez
 Susan McCullough
 Kitty McNamee
 Petr Zahradnicek

2012

 Melissa Barak
 Thang Dao
 Darrell Grand Moultrie
 Wendy Seyb

2011

 Brian Enos
 Heather Maloy
 Peter Pucci
 Paula Weber

2010

Ann Marie DeAngelo
 Helen Heineman
 Viktor Kabaniaev
Peter Quanz

2009
 
 Sidra Bell
 Deanna Carter
 Rick McCullough
 Olivier Wevers of Whim W'Him

2008

 Amy Seiwert
 Edmund Stripe
Emery LeCrone
 Ma Cong

2007

 Melissa Barak
 Frank Chaves
 Edwaard Liang
 Jerry Opdenaker

2006

 Ron De Jesus
 Graham Lustig
Charles Moulton
 Gina Patterson

2005

 Val Caniparoli
 Christopher d'Amboise
 William Soleau
 Luca Veggetti

2004

 Ann Marie DeAngelo
 Peter Pucci
 James Sewell and James Sewell Ballet
 Lynne Taylor-Corbett

References

External links

<

Ballet choreographers
Dance organizations